Romain Thomas (born 12 June 1988) is a French professional footballer who plays as a defender for  club Caen.

Career
Born in Landerneau, Thomas started his career with Stade Brestois 29, where he played 3 games in Ligue 2 between 2007 and 2010. During the 2008–09 season, he had a loan spell at Pacy Vallée-d'Eure. Ahead of the 2010–11 campaign, Thomas signed for Championnat de France amateur side USJA Carquefou where he spent three seasons, making 96 league appearances for the club.

Thomas joined Angers in June 2013. In August 2017, it was announced he had agreed a contract extension until 2022 with the club.

On 17 June 2022, Thomas signed a three-year contract with Caen.

References

External links
 
 
 

1988 births
Living people
People from Landerneau
Sportspeople from Finistère
French footballers
Association football defenders
Stade Brestois 29 players
Pacy Ménilles RC players
USJA Carquefou players
Angers SCO players
Stade Malherbe Caen players
Ligue 1 players
Ligue 2 players
Championnat National players
Footballers from Brittany
Brittany international footballers